Rhynchostylis rieferi is a species of orchid endemic to the Philippines. Its morphology is very similar to Rhynchostylis retusa, however the flowers are smaller and the leaf tip forms an acute spike. The species was discovered from a cultivated plant in the United States of America.

References

http://www.orchidspecies.com/rhynreiferii.htm
HIGGINS, W. E. (2012). A New Name For A Distinctive Rhynchostylis (Orchidae) And The Misapplication of Rhynchostylis praemorsa. Selbyana, 31(1), 40–43.
World Checklist of Selected Plant Families: Royal Botanic Gardens, Kew: Rhynchostylis rieferi. (2013). Retrieved March 21, 2016, from http://apps.kew.org/wcsp/namedetail.do?name_id=492854

rieferi